Viktoria is the fourteenth studio album by Swedish black metal band Marduk. It was released on 22 June 2018. The album's lyrics follow in a similar vein to some of their previous albums, focusing on historical World War II lyrical themes. It is the band's last album to feature bassist Magnus "Devo" Andersson and drummer Fredrik Widigs.

Track listing

Credits
Credits adapted from Metal Force.

Daniel "Mortuus" Rostén – vocals
Morgan Steinmeyer Håkansson – guitars
Magnus "Devo" Andersson – bass
Fredrik Widigs – drums

Charts

References

2018 albums
Marduk (band) albums
Century Media Records albums